The 2018 Men's  World Junior Squash Championships is the men's edition of the 2018 World Junior Squash Championships, which serves as the individual world Junior championship for squash players. The event took place in Chennai in India from 18 to 23 July 2018.
Mostafa Asal won the tournament after defeating compatriot Marwan Tarek in the final.

Seeds

Draw and results

Finals

Top half

Section 1

Section 2

Section 3

Section 4

Bottom half

Section 5

Section 6

Section 7

Section 8

See also
2018 Women's World Junior Squash Championships
World Junior Squash Championships

References

External links
Men's World Junior Championships 2018 official website

World Junior Squash Championships
Wor
Squash
Squash tournaments in India
International sports competitions hosted by India